Acacia spirorbis is a tree belonging to the genus Acacia and the subgenus Juliflorae that is native to eastern Australia.

Description
Like most species of Acacia it has phyllodes rather than true leaves. The glabrous and dark green coloured phyllodes have a narrowly elliptic shaped and recurved to a sickle shape. When it blooms it produces simple inflorescences that occur in pairs in the axils. The seeds inside the pods are arranged longitudinally or slightly obliquely. The shiny dark brown seeds have an oblong shape with a bright yellow aril that is folded many times under the seed.

Taxonomy
The species was first formally described by the botanist Jacques Labillardière in 1825 as part of the work Sertum austro-caledonicum. It was reclassified by Leslie Pedley in 1987 as Racosperma spirorbis and then transferred back to genus Acacia in 2006.

There are two subspecies:
Acacia spirorbis subsp. spirorbis
Acacia spirorbis subsp. solandri

Distribution
It is endemic to the coastal parts of Queensland extending from Townsville in the north down to around MacKay in the south including numerous islands off the coast and a smaller isolated population on Rat Island further south near Rockhampton. The tree is usually situated along the margins of rainforest communities or as a part of Eucalyptus woodlands in drier areas. It is also native to Vanuatu and New Caledonia.

See also
List of Acacia species

References

spirorbis
Flora of Queensland
Taxa named by Jacques Labillardière
Plants described in 1825